Dairy cattle (also called dairy cows) are cattle bred for the ability to produce large quantities of milk, from which dairy products are made.  Dairy cattle generally are of the species Bos taurus.

Historically, little distinction was made between dairy cattle and beef cattle, with the same stock often being used for both meat and milk production.  Today, the bovine industry is more specialized and most dairy cattle have been bred to produce large volumes of milk.

Management 

Dairy cows may be found either in herds or dairy farms, where dairy farmers own, manage, care for, and collect milk from them, or on commercial farms.  Herd sizes vary around the world depending on landholding culture and social structure. The United States has an estimated 9 million cows in around 75,000 dairy herds, with an average herd size of 120 cows. The number of small herds is falling rapidly with the 3,100 herds with over 500 cows producing 51% of U.S. milk in 2007. The United Kingdom dairy herd overall has nearly 1.5 million cows, with about 100 head reported on an average farm. In New Zealand, the average herd has more than 375 cows, while in Australia, there are approximately 220 cows in the average herd.

Dairy farming, like many other livestock-rearing methods, can be split into intensive and extensive management systems.

Intensive systems focus towards maximum production per cow in the herd. This involves formulating their diet to provide ideal nutrition and housing the cows in a confinement system such as free stall or tie stall. These cows are housed indoors throughout their lactation and may be put to pasture during their 60-day dry period before ideally calving again. Free stall-style barns involve cattle loosely housed where they can have free access to feed, water, and stalls, but are moved to another part of the barn to be milked multiple times a day. In a tie-stall system, the milking units are brought to the cows during each milking. These cattle are tethered within their stalls with free access to water and feed provided. In extensive systems, cattle are mainly outside on pasture for most of their lives. These cattle are generally lower in milk production and are herded multiple times daily to be milked. The systems used greatly depend on the climate and available land of the region in which the farm is situated.

To maintain lactation, a dairy cow must be bred and produce calves. Depending on market conditions, the cow may be bred with a "dairy bull" or a "beef bull."  Female calves (heifers) with dairy breeding may be kept as replacement cows for the dairy herd.  If a replacement cow turns out to be a substandard producer of milk, she then goes to market and can be slaughtered for beef.  Male calves can either be used later as a breeding bull or sold and used for veal or beef.  Dairy farmers usually begin breeding or artificially inseminating heifers around 13 months of age. A cow's gestation period is about nine months. Newborn calves are separated from their mothers quickly, usually within three days, as the mother/calf bond intensifies over time and delayed separation can cause extreme stress on both cow and calf.

Domestic cows can live beyond 20 years; however, those raised for dairy rarely live that long, as the average cow is removed from the dairy herd around age six and marketed for beef. In 2014, roughly 9.5% of the cattle slaughtered in the U.S. were culled dairy cows - cows that can no longer be seen as an economic asset to the dairy farm. These animals may be sold due to reproductive problems or common diseases of milk cows such as mastitis and lameness.

Calf 

Most heifers (female calves) are kept on farm to be raised as replacement heifers, bred to enter the production cycle. Market calves are generally sold at two weeks of age and bull calves may fetch a premium over heifers due to their size, either current or potential.  Calves may be sold for veal, or for one of several types of beef production, depending on available local crops and markets. Such bull calves may be castrated if turnout onto pastures is envisaged, to make them less aggressive. Purebred bulls from elite cows may be put into progeny testing schemes to find out whether they might become superior sires for breeding. Such animals can become extremely valuable.

Most dairy farms separate calves from their mothers within a day of birth to reduce transmission of disease and simplify management of milking cows. Studies have been done allowing calves to remain with their mothers for 1, 4, 7 or 14 days after birth. Cows whose calves were removed longer than one day after birth showed increased searching, sniffing and vocalizations. However, calves allowed to remain with their mothers for longer periods showed weight gains at three times the rate of early removals as well as more searching behavior and better social relationships with other calves.

After separation, some young dairy calves subsist on commercial milk replacer, a feed based on dried milk powder. Milk replacer is an economical alternative to feeding whole milk because it is cheaper, can be bought at varying fat and protein percentages, and is typically less contaminated than whole milk when handled properly. Some farms pasteurize and feed calves milk from the cows in the herd instead of using replacer. A day-old calf consumes around 5 liters of milk per day.

Cattle are social animals; their ancestors tended to live in matriarchal groups of mothers and offspring. The formation of "friendships" between two cows is common and long lasting. Traditionally individual housing systems were used in calf rearing, to reduce the risk of disease spread and provide specific care. However, due to their social behaviour the grouping of offspring may be better for the calves' overall welfare. Social interaction between the calves can have a positive effect on their growth. It has been seen that calves housed in grouped penning were found to eat more feed than those in single pens, suggesting social facilitation of feeding behaviour in the calves. Play behaviour in pre-weaned dairy calves has also been suggested to help build social skills for later in life. It has been seen that those reared in grouped housing are more likely to become the dominant cattle in a new combination of animals. These dominant animals have a priority choice of feed or lying areas and are generally stronger animals. For these reasons, it has become common practice to group or pair calves in their housing. It has become common in Canada to see paired or grouped housing in outdoor hutches or in an indoor pack penning.

Bull 
A bull calf with high genetic potential may be reared for breeding purposes.  It may be kept by a dairy farm as a herd bull, to provide natural breeding for the herd of cows.  A bull may service up to 50 or 60 cows during a breeding season.  Any more and the sperm count declines, leading to cows "returning to service" (needing to be bred again).  A herd bull may only stay for one season, as when most bulls reach over two years old their temperament becomes too unpredictable.

Bull calves intended for breeding are commonly bred on specialized dairy breeding farms, not production farms. These farms are the major source of stocks for artificial insemination.

Milk production levels 

The dairy cow produces large amounts of milk in its lifetime. Production levels peak at around 40 to 60 days after calving. Production declines steadily afterwards until milking is stopped at about 10 months. The cow is "dried off" for about sixty days before calving again. Within a 12 to 14-month inter-calving cycle, the milking period is about 305 days or 10 months long.

High production cows are more difficult to breed at a two-year interval. Many farms take the view that 24 or even 36 month cycles are more appropriate for this type of cow.

Dairy cows may continue to be economically productive for many lactation cycles. In theory a longevity of 10 lactations is possible. The chances of problems arising which may lead to a cow being culled are high, however; the average herd life of US Holstein is today fewer than 3 lactations. This requires more herd replacements to be reared or purchased. Over 90% of all cows are slaughtered for 4 main reasons:

Infertility – failure to conceive and reduced milk production.
Cows are at their most fertile between 60 and 80 days after calving. Cows remaining "open" (not with calf) after this period become increasingly difficult to breed, which may be due to poor health. Failure to expel the afterbirth from a previous pregnancy, luteal cysts, or metritis, an infection of the uterus, are common causes of infertility

Mastitis – a persistent and potentially fatal mammary gland infection, leading to high somatic cell counts and loss of production.
Mastitis is recognized by a reddening and swelling of the infected quarter of the udder and the presence of whitish clots or pus in the milk. Treatment is possible with long-acting antibiotics but milk from such cows is not marketable until drug residues have left the cow's system, also called withdrawal period.

Lameness – persistent foot infection or leg problems causing infertility and loss of production.
High feed levels of highly digestible carbohydrate cause acidic conditions in the cow's rumen. This leads to laminitis and subsequent lameness, leaving the cow vulnerable to other foot infections and problems which may be exacerbated by standing in faeces or water soaked areas.

Production – some animals fail to produce economic levels of milk to justify their feed costs.
Production below  of milk per day is not economically viable.

Cow longevity is strongly correlated with production levels. Lower production cows live longer than high production cows, but may be less profitable. Cows no longer wanted for milk production are sent to slaughter. Their meat is of relatively low value and is generally used for processed meat. Another factor affecting milk production is the stress the cow is faced with. Psychologists at the University of Leicester, UK, analyzed the musical preference of milk cows and found out that music actually influences the dairy cow's lactation. Calming music can improve milk yield, probably because it reduces stress and relaxes the cows in much the same way as it relaxes humans.

Cow comfort and its effects on milk production 
Certain behaviors such as eating, ruminating, and lying down can be related to the health of the cow and cow comfort. These behaviors can also be related to the productivity of the cows. Likewise, stress, disease, and discomfort negatively affect milk productivity. Therefore, it can be said that it is in the best interest of the farmer to increase eating, rumination, and lying down and decrease stress, disease, and discomfort to achieve the maximum productivity possible. Also, estrous behaviors such as mounting can be a sign of cow comfort, because if a cow is lame, nutritionally deficient, or housed in an over crowded barn, its estrous behaviors are altered.

Feeding behaviors are important for the dairy cow, as feeding is how the cow ingests dry matter. However, the cow must ruminate to fully digest the feed and utilize the nutrients in the feed. Dairy cows with good rumen health are likely to be more profitable than cows with poor rumen health—as a healthy rumen aids in digestion of nutrients. An increase in the time a cow spends ruminating is associated with the increase in health and an increase in milk production. The productivity of dairy cattle is most efficient when the cattle have a full rumen. Also, the standing action while feeding after milking has been suggested to enhance udder health. The delivery of fresh feed while the cattle are away for milking stimulates the cattle to feed upon return, potentially reducing the prevalence of mastitis as the sphincters have time to close while standing. This makes the pattern of feeding directly after being milked an ideal method of increasing the efficiency of the herd.

Cows have a high motivation to lie down. They should lie down for at least five to six hours after every meal to ruminate well. When the lactating dairy cow lies down, blood flow is increased to the mammary gland which in return results in a higher milk yield. When they stand too long, cows become stressed, lose weight, get sore feet, and produce less milk.

To ensure that the dairy cows lie down as much as needed, the stalls must be comfortable. A stall should have a rubber mat and bedding, and be large enough for the cow to lie down and get up comfortably. Signs that the stalls may not be comfortable enough for the cows are the cows are standing, either ruminating or not, instead of lying down, or perching, which is when the cow has its front end in the stall and their back end out of the stall. Dried manure, almond shells, straw, sand, or waterbeds are used for cow bedding.

There are two types of housing systems in dairy production, free style housing and tie stall. Free style housing is where the cow is free to walk around and interact with its environment and other members of the herd. Tie stall housing is when the cow is chained to a stanchion stall with the milking units and feed coming to them.

Artificial light and daylight inlets have an impact on milk production and cow behavior. For cows in lactation a light program of 16 hours light and 8 hours of darkness is recommended, while for non-lactating pregnant cows 8 hours of light and 16 hours of darkness seem to be a better fit.

By-products and processing 
Pasteurization is the process of heating milk to a high enough temperature for a short period of time to kill the microbes in the milk and increase keep time and decrease spoilage time. By killing the microbes, decreasing the transmission of infection, and elimination of enzymes the quality of the milk and the shelf life increases. By-products of milk include butterfat, cream, curds, and whey. Butterfat is the main lipid in milk. The cream contains 18–40% butterfat. The industry can be divided into 2 market territories; fluid milk and industrialized milk such as yogurt, cheeses, and ice cream.

Whey protein makes up about 20% of milk’s protein composition and is separated from the casein (80% of milk’s protein make up) during the process of curdling cheese. This protein is commonly used in protein bars, beverages and concentrated powder, due to its high quality amino acid profile. It contains levels of both essential amino acids as well as branched that are above those of soy, meat, and wheat. "Diafiltered" milk is a process of ultrafiltration of the fluid milk to separate lactose and water from the casein and whey proteins. This process allows for more efficiency in cheese making and gives the potential to produce low-carb dairy products.

Reproduction 
Since the 1950s, artificial insemination (AI) is used at most dairy farms;  these farms may keep no bull.  Artificial insemination uses estrus synchronization to indicate when the cow is going through ovulation and is susceptible to fertilization. Advantages of using AI include its low cost and ease compared to maintaining a bull, ability to select from a large number of bulls, elimination of diseases in the dairy industry, improved genetics and improved animal welfare. Rather than a large bull jumping on a smaller heifer or weaker cow, AI allows the farmer to complete the breeding procedure within 5 minutes with minimum stress placed on the individual female's body.

Dairy cattle are polyestrous, meaning they cycle continuously throughout the year. They tend to be on a 21 day estrus cycle. However for management purposes, some operations use synthetic hormones to synchronize their cows or heifers to have them breed and calve at the ideal times. These hormones are short term and only used when necessary. For example, one common protocol for synchronization involves an injection of GnRH (gonadotrophin releasing hormone). which increases the levels of follicle stimulating hormone and luteinizing hormone in the body. Then, seven days later prostaglandin F2-alpha is injected, followed by another GnRH injection 48 hours later. This protocol causes the animal to ovulate 24 hours later.

Estrus is often called standing heat in cattle and refers to the time in their cycle where the female is receptive towards the male. Estrus behaviour can be detected by an experienced stockman. These behaviours can include standing to be mounted, mounting other cows, restlessness, decreased milk production, and decreased feed intake.

More recently, embryo transfer has been used to enable the multiplication of progeny from elite cows.  Such cows are given hormone treatments to produce multiple embryos. These are then 'flushed' from the cow's uterus. 7–12 embryos are consequently removed from these donor cows and transferred into other cows who serve as surrogate mothers. This results in between three and six calves instead of the normal single or (rarely) twins.

Hormone use 
Farmers in some countries sometimes administer hormone treatments to dairy cows to increase milk production and reproduction.

About 17% of dairy cows in the United States are injected with Bovine somatotropin, also called recombinant bovine somatotropin (rBST), recombinant bovine growth hormone (rBGH), or artificial growth hormone. The use of this hormone increases milk production by 11%–25%. The U.S. Food and Drug Administration (FDA) has ruled that rBST is harmless to people. The use of rBST is banned in Canada, parts of the European Union, as well as Australia and New Zealand.

In the United States the Pasteurized Milk Ordinance requires a milk sample is taken from every farm and from every load of milk delivered to a processing plant. These samples are then tested for antibiotic and any milk testing positive is discarded and farm identified. Traceback to the dairy is undertaken by the FDA with further consequences including the possibility revocation of ability to sell milk.

Nutrition 

Nutrition plays an important role in keeping cattle healthy and strong. Implementing an adequate nutrition program can also improve milk production and reproductive performance. Nutrient requirements may not be the same depending on the animal's age and stage of production. Diets are formulated to meet the dairy cow's energy and amino acid requirements for lactation, growth, and/or reproduction.

Forages, which refer especially to anything grown in the field such as hay, straw, corn silage, or grass silage, are the most common type of feed used. The base of most lactating dairy cattle diets is high quality forage. Cereal grains, as the main contributors of starch to diets, are important in helping to meet the energy needs of dairy cattle. Barley is an excellent source of balanced amounts of protein, energy, and fiber.

Ensuring adequate body fat reserves is essential for cattle to produce milk and also to keep reproductive efficiency. However, if cattle get excessively fat or too thin, they run the risk of developing metabolic problems and may have problems with calving. Scientists have found that a variety of fat supplements can benefit conception rates of lactating dairy cows. Some of these different fats include oleic acids, found in canola oil, animal tallow, and yellow grease; palmitic acid found in granular fats and dry fats; and linolenic acids which are found in cottonseed, safflower, sunflower, and soybean.

Diets can additionally be formulated to strategically reduce methane emissions. Ruminants such as the cow have microbes in their rumen called methanogens which are capable of digesting down plant material so it can be utilized for energy, but also generates methane as a byproduct which is then released into the atmosphere by belching. Diets that include feed additives and supplements such as 3-nitrooxypropanol, and the red seaweed (Asparagopsis taxiformis)  have been found to reduce enteric methane emissions. Some of these feed additives have already been approved for farmer usage while others continue to be studied for safety and efficacy.

Breeds 

According to the Purebred Dairy Cattle Association, PDCA, there are 7 major dairy breeds in the United States.  These are: Holstein, Brown Swiss, Guernsey, Ayrshire, Jersey, Red and White, and Milking Shorthorn.

Holstein cows originate from the Netherlands and have distinct black and white or more rarely red and white markings. Holstein cows are the biggest of all dairy breeds. They are known for their outstanding milk production among the main breeds of dairy cattle. Of the 9 million dairy cows in the U.S., approximately 90% of them are of the Holstein descent.

Brown Swiss cows are widely accepted as the oldest dairy cattle breed, originally coming from a part of northeastern Switzerland. Some experts think that the modern Brown Swiss skeleton is similar to one found that looks to be from around the year 4000 BC Also, there is evidence that monks started breeding these cows about 1000 years ago.

The Ayrshire breed first originated in the County of Ayr in Scotland. It became regarded as a well established breed in 1812. The different breeds that were crossed to form the Ayrshire are not exactly known. However, there is evidence that several breeds were crossed with the native cattle to create the breed.

Guernsey cows originated just off the coast of France on the small Isle of Guernsey. The breed was first known as a separate breed around 1700. Guernseys are known for their ability to produce very high quality milk from grass. Also, the term "Golden Guernsey" is very common as Guernsey cattle produce rich, yellow milk rather than the standard white milk other cow breeds produce.

The Jersey originates on the island of Jersey in the Channel Islands. The milk is rich and has a yellowish tinge; the fat content may exceed 6%. American Jerseys have been selectively bred for higher milk yield, and are often larger and coarser than the island stock.

Animal welfare 
Animal welfare refers to both the physical and mental state of an animal, and how it is coping with its situation. An animal is considered in a good state of welfare if it is able to express its innate behaviour, comfortable, healthy, safe, well nourished, and is not suffering from harmful states such as distress, fear and pain. Good animal welfare requires disease prevention and veterinary treatment, appropriate shelter, management, nutrition, and humane handling. If the animal is slaughtered then it is no longer "good animal welfare". It is the human responsibility of the animals' wellbeing in all husbandry and management practices including humane euthanasia.

Proper animal handling, or stockmanship, is crucial to dairy animals' welfare as well as the safety of their handlers. Improper handling techniques can stress cattle leading to impaired production and health, such as increased slipping injuries. Additionally, the majority of nonfatal worker injuries on a dairy farm are from interactions with cattle. Dairy animals are handled on a daily basis for a wide variety of purposes including health-related management practices and movement from freestalls to the milking parlor. Due to the prevalence of human-animal interactions on dairy farms, researchers, veterinarians, and farmers alike have focused on furthering our understanding of stockmanship and educating agriculture workers. Stockmanship is a complex concept that involves the timing, positioning, speed, direction of movement, and sounds and touch of the handler.

A recent survey of Minnesota dairy farms revealed that 42.6% of workers learned stockmanship techniques from family members, and 29.9% had participated in stockmanship training. However, as the growing U.S. dairy industry increasingly relies on an immigrant workforce, stockmanship training and education resources become more pertinent. Clearly communicating and managing a large culturally diverse workforce brings new challenges such as language barriers and time limitations. 
Organizations like the Upper Midwest Agriculture Safety and Health Center offer resources such as bilingual training videos, fact sheets, and informational posters for dairy worker training. Additionally the Beef Quality Assurance Program offer seminars, live demonstrations, and online resources for stockmanship training.

For cows to reach high performance in milk yields and reproduction, they must be in great condition and comfortable in the system. Once an individual’s welfare is reduced, so does her efficiency and production. This creates more cost and time on the operation, therefore most farmers strive to create a healthy, hygienic, atmosphere for their cattle. As well as provide quality nutrition that keep the cows yield high.

The production of milk requires that the cow be in lactation, which is a result of the cow having given birth to a calf. The cycle of insemination, pregnancy, parturition, and lactation is followed by a "dry" period of about two months before calving, which allows udder tissue to regenerate. A dry period that falls outside this time frames can result in decreased milk production in subsequent lactation.  Dairy operations therefore include both the production of milk and the production of calves. Bull calves are either castrated and raised as steers for beef production or used for veal.

The practice of dairy production has been criticized by animal rights proponents. Some of the ethical reasons regarding dairy production cited include how often the dairy cattle are impregnated, the separation of calves from their mothers, the fact that dairy cows are considered "spent" and culled at a relatively young age, as well as environmental concerns regarding any cattle production.

References 

Dairy farming
Cows